Liesl Laurie (born 24 December 1990 in Johannesburg, South Africa) is a South African model and beauty pageant titleholder who was crowned Miss South Africa 2015. She has represented her country at the Miss World 2015, in Sanya, China on 19 December 2015.

Personal life
Laurie grew up in Eldorado Park, a mainly Coloured suburb in  Johannesburg. She has a Bachelor of Commerce General degree and is a social activist.

Miss South Africa 2015
On 29 March 2015 Laurie was crowned as Miss South Africa 2015 by reigning titleholder Zipozakhe Zokufa. The Miss South Africa Pageant was held at the Sun City Super Bowl. Laurie defeated 11 other finalists during the main event. Miss World 2014 Rolene Strauss attended the event, along with two other South Africans to have won Miss World, i.e. Penelope Coelen, Miss World 1958 and Anneline Kriel, Miss World 1974.

Miss World 2015
As Miss South Africa, Laurie participated in the Miss World 2015 in Sanya, China, as one of 114 contestants. She was one of the Top 10 finalists and became the Continental Queen of Africa, the contestant who was placed the highest of all the African contestants.

References

External links
Official Miss South Africa website

Miss South Africa winners
People from Johannesburg
1990 births
Living people
Miss World 2015 delegates